Percival Albert Perrin (26 May 1876 – 20 November 1945), known as either "Percy" or "Peter", was an English cricketer, who played for Essex as a right-handed middle-order batsman for more than thirty years from 1896.

Perrin was a Tottenham publican and a property developer who organised his considerable business activities around his cricket, turning out for Essex regularly from 1896 to 1926, and not retiring until 1928. His total of 496 County Championship matches for Essex is a record for an amateur player in English cricket.

A tall batsman who initially relied on driving for most of his runs, Perrin developed into a reliable player with virtually all the strokes. He and Charles McGahey, a similarly tall amateur, played together for Essex for many seasons and were known as the "Essex Twins". Perrin was the better batsman: he scored 1,000 in 18 seasons and in his long career made 29,709 runs at an average just short of 36 runs per innings.  He scored 66 centuries, the third highest number – after John Langridge and Ken McEwan – of any player who never played Test cricket.

Perrin's biggest innings was a huge unbeaten 343, made out of an Essex total of 597 against Derbyshire at Chesterfield in 1904, which is the highest innings ever played by a batsman in a losing team.

Another record statistic from that innings, the 68 fours hit, gives a clue why Perrin was never selected for Test cricket, or even for one of the representative matches such as Gentlemen v Players: he was slow in the field and not a good runner. On the strength of that innings, though, he was picked as a Wisden Cricketer of the Year in the almanack for 1905.

Apparently a shy man, Perrin captained Essex only occasionally, serving happily under his friends McGahey and Johnny Douglas and deputising for them when needed. But in retirement, Perrin's knowledge and his availability led him to become an England selector in 1926 and later from 1930 to 1939, chairing the committee in the last year. When E. M. Wellings asked Douglas Jardine about how he regarded the selectors, Jardine replied, "We used to let Percy Perrin in the dressing-room, but he used to sit at the end of the balcony and keep quiet; but we wouldn't let any of the others in."

References

External links
 

1876 births
1945 deaths
British publicans
East of England cricketers
English cricketers
England cricket team selectors
Essex cricketers
Gentlemen cricketers
Gentlemen of England cricketers
Gentlemen of the South cricketers
London County cricketers
Marylebone Cricket Club cricketers
North v South cricketers
People from Stoke Newington
People from Hickling, Norfolk
Wisden Cricketers of the Year
English cricketers of 1890 to 1918
English cricketers of 1919 to 1945
Wembley Park cricketers